Arizona Avenue could refer to:
Arizona Avenue (Chandler, Arizona)
Arizona Avenue (Washington, D.C.)
Arizona Avenue in Baltimore, Maryland